The 1987–88 Pittsburgh Panthers men's basketball team represented the University of Pittsburgh in the 1987–88 NCAA Division I men's basketball season. Led by head coach Paul Evans, the Panthers finished with a record of 24–7. They received an at-large bid to the 1988 NCAA Division I men's basketball tournament where, as a #2 seed, they lost in overtime in the second round to Vanderbilt.

Schedule

|-
!colspan=9 style=| Non-conference regular season

|-
!colspan=9 style=| Big East regular season

|-
!colspan=9 style=| Non-conference regular season

|-
!colspan=9 style=| Big East regular season

|-
!colspan=9 style=| Non-conference regular season

|-
!colspan=9 style=| Big East regular season

|-
!colspan=9 style=| Big East tournament

|-
!colspan=9 style=| NCAA tournament

Rankings

References

Pittsburgh Panthers men's basketball seasons
Pittsburgh
Pittsburgh
Pittsburgh Pan
Pittsburgh Pan